Ruhnu Airfield  is an airfield on Ruhnu island in Estonia. It is owned by the same company as Kuressaare Airport, located 70km further north, on Saaremaa island.

Overview
The runway has no landing lights. The airfield is managed by AS Tallinna Lennujaam Kuressaare lennujaam (Kuressaare Airport).

Airlines and destinations

The following airlines operate domestic scheduled flights at Ruhnu Airfield:

References

External links
Ruhnu aerodrome
Ruhnu regular flights
Luftverkehr Friesland Harle

Airports in Estonia
Buildings and structures in Saare County
Ruhnu